The 1980 Western Carolina Catamounts team was an American football team that represented Western Carolina University as a member of the Southern Conference (SoCon) during the 1980 NCAA Division I-A football season. In their 12th year under head coach Bob Waters, the team compiled an overall record of 3–7–1, with a mark of 2–4–1 in conference play, finishing in fifth place in the SoCon.

Schedule

References

Western Carolina
Western Carolina Catamounts football seasons
Western Carolina Catamounts football